The X-Life is an American reality television series on VH1. The series debuted on January 10, 2011.

Premise
The series follows three extreme athletes and their wives as they navigate their lives with their famous careers.

Cast
Pierre Luc Gagnon (Vert Skater)
Denise Russo
Cory "Nasty" Nastazio (BMX Dirt Jumper)
Nicole Panattoni
Jeremy "Twitch" Stenburg (FMX)
Susie Stenberg

Episodes

References

2010s American reality television series
2011 American television series debuts
VH1 original programming
English-language television shows
2011 American television series endings